The 2017 Women's Centrobasket Championship  is held in the city of Saint Thomas, U.S. Virgin Islands from July 12 to July 16, 2017.

Group stage

Round robin

Final standings

References

External links
 Official website

Centrobasket Women
2016–17 in North American basketball
2017 in women's basketball
International women's basketball competitions hosted by the United States
2017 in Central American sport
2017 in Caribbean sport